Alopecosa mariae is a wolf spider species in the genus Alopecosa with a palearctic distribution.

See also 
 * List of Lycosidae species

References 

mariae
Spiders of Europe
Palearctic spiders
Spiders described in 1908